Secretum (De secreto conflictu curarum mearum, translated as The Secret or My Secret Book) is a trilogy of dialogues in Latin written by Petrarch sometime from 1347 to 1353, in which he examines his faith with the help of Saint Augustine, and "in the presence of The Lady Truth".  Secretum was not circulated until some time after Petrarch's death, and was probably meant to be a means of self-examination more than a work to be published and read by others.

The dialogue opens with Augustine chastising Petrarch for ignoring his own mortality and his fate in the afterlife by not devoting himself fully to God.  Petrarch concedes that this lack of piety is the source of his unhappiness, but he insists that he cannot overcome it.  The dialogue then turns to the question of Petrarch's seeming lack of free will, and Augustine explains that it is his love for temporal things (specifically Laura), and his pursuit of fame through poetry that "bind his will in adamantine chains".

Petrarch's turn towards religion in his later life was inspired in part by Augustine's Confessions, and Petrarch imitates Augustine's style of self-examination and harsh self-criticism in Secretum.  The ideas expressed in the dialogues are taken mostly from Augustine, particularly the importance of free will in achieving faith.  Other notable influences include Cicero and other Pre-Christian thinkers.

Secretum can be seen as an attempt by Petrarch to reconcile his Renaissance humanism and admiration of the classical world with his Christian faith.  Especially important are his rejection of love for temporal things not because it is a sin, but because it prevents him from knowing the eternal, a position that resembles classical philosophy far more than the contemporary Christian theology.  Classical writers are also regarded as sources of authority supporting Christianity, and Secretum quotes them more frequently than scripture.

List of authorities cited

St. Augustine
Confessions
Cicero
Academica
De amicitia
De finibus bonorum et malorum
De Senectute
Epistulae ad Atticum
Pro Marcello
Tusculanae Disputationes
Horace
Epistles
Odes
Juvenal
Satires
Macrobius
Saturnalia
Ovid
Amores
Epistulae ex Ponto
Metamorphoses
Remedia Amoris

Petrarch
AfricaEpistlesPenitential PsalmsSeneca the ElderDeclamationsSeneca the YoungerDe BeneficiisDe Tranquillitate AnimiEpistlesNaturales quaestionesSuetonius
De vita Caesarum
Terence
AndriaEunuchusPhormio
VirgilAeneid (26 times)EcloguesGeorgicsScripture
Book of Wisdom
Psalm 84
Second Epistle to the Corinthians

External links
William H. Draper, translator (1911). Petrarch's Secret. Text of Petrarch's Secretum'' I dialogue in English.
 Hans Baron, Petrarch's "Secretum": Its Making and Its Meaning, Medieval Academy of America, 1985. {}

Medieval literature
14th-century books
Petrarch